Lady Margaret Sackville (1562 – 19 August 1591), formerly Lady Margaret Howard, was the wife of Robert Sackville, 2nd Earl of Dorset.

Margaret was the daughter of Thomas Howard, 4th Duke of Norfolk, and his second wife, Margaret Audley. In keeping with family tradition, she was a devout Roman Catholic. Her half-brother, Philip Howard, 13th Earl of Arundel, died while imprisoned by Queen Elizabeth, and was later canonised as a saint in the Catholic Church.

Her mother died in January 1564, while Margaret was still a child; and her father, a Catholic with a Protestant education, was arrested in 1569 for his involvement in intrigues against Elizabeth. Although he was briefly released, in September 1571 he was imprisoned again after his participation in the Ridolfi Plot was discovered, and he was executed in June 1572. After their father's death, Margaret and her brothers Philip, Thomas and William were placed in the care of their uncle, Henry Howard, who also took charge of their education. During this time, Margaret and her brothers lived with their uncle at Audley End, Essex, one of his family's estates. 

Margaret married Robert Sackville (1561–1609) in February 1580. Her husband, who was from an aristocratic family, began to train in law as a member of the Inner Temple, but was not called to the bar. In 1585 he was elected to parliament for Sussex, and became a prominent member of the Commons. 

In 1585, she visited her sister-in-law, the Countess of Arundel, formerly Anne Dacre, in Essex; the countess's movements were restricted because of the earl's imprisonment. Lady Margaret was under instructions from the queen not to remain at the countess's home for more than one night. Both women were heavily pregnant and Lady Margaret went into labour during the visit, giving birth successfully.

The children of Robert and Margaret Sackville included:
Anne (1586 – 25 September 1664), who was married twice: first to Sir Edward Seymour, eldest son of Edward Seymour, Viscount Beauchamp, and, second, to Sir Edward Lewis, by whom she had children. A memorial to her, with effigies of herself and her second husband (d. 1630), stands in Edington Priory Church, Wiltshire.
Richard Sackville, 3rd Earl of Dorset (1589–1624)
Edward Sackville, 4th Earl of Dorset (1591–1652)
Cecily, married Sir Henry Compton, and had children

Lady Margaret died suddenly on 19 August 1591, aged 29, at Knole, Kent, a property which had been granted to her husband's father by Queen Elizabeth during the 1560s. Robert Southwell's Triumphs over Death (published in 1596, after the poet's execution) was dedicated to her and her surviving children; it was supposedly written and sent to her half-brother, the Earl of Arundel, in prison, to comfort him.

Because Lady Margaret died before her husband inherited the earldom of Dorset, she never became countess. The year after her death, her husband married the twice-widowed Anne, daughter of Sir John Spencer of Althorp. He left instructions in his will that he should be buried at Withyham, East Sussex, "as near to my first dearly beloved wife ... as can be".

References

1562 births
1591 deaths
16th-century English nobility
Margaret
Margaret
Daughters of English dukes
16th-century English women
People from Sevenoaks